Ireland participated in the Eurovision Song Contest 2007 with the song "They Can't Stop the Spring" written by John Waters and Tommy Moran. The song was performed by the band Dervish, which was internally selected in November 2006 by the Irish broadcaster Raidió Teilifís Éireann (RTÉ) to represent the nation at the 2007 contest in Helsinki, Finland. RTÉ organised the national final Eurosong 2007 to select the song that Dervish would perform. Four songs faced a public televote, ultimately resulting in the selection of "They Can't Stop the Spring" as the Irish entry.

As one of the ten highest placed finishers in 2006, Ireland automatically qualified to compete in the final of the Eurovision Song Contest. Performing during the show in position 4, Ireland placed twenty-fourth (last) out of the 24 participating countries with 5 points.

Background

Prior to the 2007 Contest, Ireland had participated in the Eurovision Song Contest forty times since its first entry in 1965. Ireland has won the contest a record seven times in total. The country's first win came in 1970, with then-18-year-old Dana winning with "All Kinds of Everything". Ireland holds the record for being the only country to win the contest three times in a row (in 1992, 1993 and 1994), as well as having the only three-time winner (Johnny Logan, who won in 1980 as a singer, 1987 as a singer-songwriter, and again in 1992 as a songwriter). The Irish entry in 2006, "Every Song Is a Cry for Love" performed by Brian Kennedy, managed to qualify to the final and placed tenth.

The Irish national broadcaster, Raidió Teilifís Éireann (RTÉ), broadcasts the event within Ireland and organises the selection process for the nation's entry. From 2003 to 2005, RTÉ had set up the talent contest You're a Star to choose both the song and performer to compete at Eurovision for Ireland, with the public involved in the selection. The broadcaster had internally selected the artist in 2006, while the song was chosen in a televised competition, a procedure that was continued for the 2007 Eurovision Song Contest.

Before Eurovision

Artist selection
RTÉ confirmed their intentions to participate at the 2007 Eurovision Song Contest on 16 October 2006. On 14 November 2006, the broadcaster announced that they had internally selected the band Dervish to represent Ireland in Helsinki. Prior to Dervish's selection as the Irish contestant, artists that were rumoured in Irish media to be in talks with RTÉ included former contest winners Johnny Logan and Linda Martin, the winner of the talent contest You're a Star Lucia Evans and Ronan Keating. Along with the announcement that Dervish would represent Ireland on 14 November, RTÉ announced that a national final would be held to select their song.

Eurosong 2007 
On 22 November 2006, RTÉ opened a submission period where composers were able to submit their songs for the competition until 8 January 2007. The broadcaster sought songs that fit the style of both Dervish and the contest. At the closing of the deadline, over 200 songs were received. The competing songs were selected by a five-member jury panel with members appointed by RTÉ: former contest winning composer Shay Healy, Universal Music Ireland director Dave Pennefather, IMRO publisher and board member Johnny Lappin, Eurovision commentator Larry Gogan and singer Eleanor Shanley. The four finalist songs were announced on 7 February 2007. The national final was broadcast on RTÉ One as well as online via the broadcaster's official website rte.ie during a special edition of The Late Late Show held on 16 February 2007 and hosted by Pat Kenny. Guest performers included Dana Rosemary Scallon, Eimear Quinn, Brotherhood of Man and Dmitry Koldun. Public televoting selected "They Can't Stop the Spring" as the winner.

At Eurovision
According to Eurovision rules, all nations with the exceptions of the host country, the "Big Four" (France, Germany, Spain and the United Kingdom) and the ten highest placed finishers in the 2006 contest are required to qualify from the semi-final in order to compete for the final; the top ten countries from the semi-final progress to the final. As one of the ten highest placed finishers in the 2006 contest, Ireland automatically qualified to compete in the final on 12 May 2007. In addition to their participation in the final, Ireland is also required to broadcast and vote in the semi-final on 10 May 2007.

In Ireland, the semi-final and the final were broadcast on RTÉ One with commentary by Marty Whelan. The two shows were also broadcast via radio on RTÉ Radio 1 with commentary by Larry Gogan. The Irish spokesperson, who announced the Irish votes during the final, was former contest winner Linda Martin.

Final
Dervish took part in technical rehearsals on 7 and 8 May, followed by dress rehearsals on 11 and 12 May. The Irish performance featured the lead singer of Dervish, Cathy Jordan, in a red and white dress playing the bodhrán and performing a routine which included the male members of Dervish, dressed in plain black shirts with jeans, following Jordan around the stage. The LED screens displayed large flowers in bloom against a starlit background, with the stage catwalk displaying a floating Irish flag at the beginning of the performance. Ireland placed twenty-fourth (last) in the final, scoring 5 points.

Voting 
Below is a breakdown of points awarded to Ireland and awarded by Ireland in the semi-final and grand final of the contest. The nation awarded its 12 points to Latvia in the semi-final and to Lithuania in the final of the contest.

Points awarded to Ireland

Points awarded by Ireland

After Eurovision
Despite finishing in last place, the broadcast of the final was watched by 780,000 viewers in Ireland with a market share of 53%, representing an increase from the previous year. Dervish announced that they would continue to play their music, stating that they "play music for music's sake" and that "it's about heart and soul, it's not about votes". Claims of "vote hijacking" were also discussed after the nation awarded its 12 points to Lithuania despite getting little elsewhere.

Criticism was also faced by RTÉ from Irish media, both over their selection of Dervish and the production of a forthcoming television special on the band, with claims that their performance was "disastrous" and that the broadcaster had signed a written contract with the band only after announcing their participation. In response, an RTÉ spokesperson stated that "contracts can be signed after such an announcement" as "you don't have to sign on the dotted line if you have a verbal agreement". The broadcaster later stated that they would be "having a sit-down and looking at our geographical position and going through the whole process", thus indicating a possible withdrawal from the 2008 contest. RTÉ confirmed their intentions to participate at the 2008 Eurovision Song Contest on 3 October 2007, announcing an open selection to choose both the artist and song to represent Ireland.

References

2007
Countries in the Eurovision Song Contest 2007
Eurovision
Eurovision